E. bakeri may refer to:
 Eleutherodactylus bakeri, a frog species endemic to Haiti
 Euproctis bakeri, Collenette, 1932, a moth species in the genus Euproctis

See also
 Bakeri (disambiguation)